Yuvanna Montalvo (born 15 March 1988) is a Venezuelan model and actress.

Biography
She began her acting career in 2007 with a guest role in the teen telenovela Somos tu y yo. Since then, she has appeared in several telenovelas produced by Venevisión such as La mujer perfecta and Válgame Dios where she was one of the co-stars.

In 2011, she married her boyfriend and fellow actor Juan Carlos García. The couple recently announced they welcomed their baby girl in February 2017 .

In 2013, she became an advertising model for Chicas Polar.

She starred in the telenovela De todas maneras Rosa in 2013.

Filmography

References

External links
 

1988 births
Actresses from Caracas
Venezuelan female models
Venezuelan telenovela actresses
Living people